The term Gypsy scale refers to one of several musical scales named after their support of and association with Romani or "Gypsy" music:

 Double harmonic scale (major), the fifth mode of Hungarian minor, or Double Harmonic minor, scale, also known as the Byzantine scale. 
 Hungarian minor scale, minor scale with raised fourth and seventh degrees, also known as Double Harmonic minor scale.
 Phrygian dominant scale, also known as Freygish or Jewish scale; Spanish Gypsy or Spanish Phrygian scale.

References

Heptatonic scales
Romani music
Musical scales
Musical scales with augmented seconds